Lobiger viridis is a species of small sea snail, a marine gastropod mollusk in the family Oxynoidae.

This small sea snail has camouflage coloration, but when it is under attack it display bright colors to frightening off a predator.

The type locality for this species is Huahine.

References

Oxynoidae
Gastropods described in 1863